Robert Schlienz (3 February 1924 – 18 June 1995) was a German football player. He is considered one of the best players ever to play for current Bundesliga side VfB Stuttgart. He also played three times for his national side.

Growing up in Zuffenhausen (it was incorporated into Stuttgart in 1931), his youth club was local FV Zuffenhausen.  In 1942, his side won the Junior Championships of the state of Württemberg.

Late in World War II, he was called up into the Wehrmacht, fighting on the Eastern Front. After being shot into the jaw, he was dismissed and sent back home. In the 1944/45 season, he began playing, initially as a "guest player", for VfB Stuttgart.

The war had taken five vital players from FV Zuffenhausen, which left the club unable to compete.  Thus, Schlienz joined VfB permanently in the summer of 1945, as the Stuttgart-Bad Cannstatt club took part in the newly founded semi-professional Oberliga Süd (South) from October 1945.

In 1945–46, Schlienz, playing as centre forward, scored 46 goals in 30 games, becoming the record goal scorer in the Oberliga.    
 
But on 14 August 1948, he lost his left forearm (it had to be amputated) in a car accident travelling to a VfB cup match in Aalen. Devastated, he thought his career was finished, but his coach, Georg Wurzer, encouraged him to continue his career.

Wurzer now positioned him in offensive midfield, as an inside forward, instead of centre forward. Schlienz made his comeback on 5 December 1948, against Bayern Munich.

Despite being handicapped, he was now captain and playmaker at VfB Stuttgart, leading the team to win the German Championship twice in 1950 and 1952 (runner-up in 1953, losing to 1. FC Kaiserslautern) and the German Cup twice in 1954 and 1958.

In 1955 and 1956, he earned three caps for (West) Germany under the famous coach Sepp Herberger.

He ended his career in 1960 and subsequently moved to the village of Dettenhausen, about 20 miles south of Stuttgart, where he died and was buried in 1995.

VfB Stuttgart named their reserves stadium in Bad Cannstatt after him almost immediately after his death.

References

External links
 

1924 births
1995 deaths
VfB Stuttgart players
Germany international footballers
German footballers
Association football forwards
Association football defenders
Association footballers with limb difference
German Army personnel of World War II
Footballers from Stuttgart
Military personnel from Baden-Württemberg
West German footballers